Carlo Vecce  (born 1959) is Professor of Italian Literature in the University of Naples “L’Orientale”, he taught also in the University of Pavia (School of Palaeography and Musical Philology, Cremona), the D'Annunzio University of Chieti–Pescara and the University of Macerata. Abroad he was visiting professor at Paris 3 (Sorbonne Nouvelle) (2001) and University of California Los Angeles (UCLA) (2009).

He received his doctorate at the Catholic University of Milan with a dissertation directed by Giuseppe Billanovich, his researches focused on Renaissance Literature and Civilization in Italy and Europe, mainly in the history of intellectual workshops in the dawn of Modern Age, and in relationships between languages (literature and visual culture). Among his authors: Iacopo Sannazaro, Pietro Bembo, Lorenzo Valla, Erasmo da Rotterdam, Girolamo Aleandro, Antonio De Ferrariis detto Galateo.

Under the guide of Carlo Pedretti, he worked on the manuscripts of Leonardo da Vinci, publishing the Book on Painting (Codex Urbinas, 1995) and of Codex Arundel (London, British Library, 1998). He published also an anthology of Leonardo’s Writings (1992), and a biography Leonardo  translated in several languages (1998, new ed. 2006). In 1994 he was appointed as a member of “Commissione Vinciana”.

He collaborated to the exhibitions of Leonardo’s drawings and manuscripts at Louvre (Paris, 2003) and Metropolitan Museum (New York, 2003), and to the exhibitions on Michelangelo at Kunsthistorisches Museum (Vienna, 1999) and Pietro Bembo (Padova, 2013). He organized the exhibition of Leonardo’s drawings from Codex Atlanticus in Ambrosian Library about Fables and tales (Milan, 2013). Under the patronage of UNESCO, he organized also the international conference I mondi di Leonardo (Milan, 2002).

Among his creative publications, the poems Feuilles (Bruxelles, 1983), the dialogue Coblas. Il mistero delle sei stanze (with Alessandro Fo and Claudio Vela) (Milano, Scheiwiller, 1986), and the poem Viaggio in Québec (“Caffé Michelangiolo”, a. XIV, n. 2, maggio-agosto 2009, pp. 24–26); Other composition for theatre: La luna capovolta. Sogni di Girolamo Cardano (first performance: Macerata, 2002), Compagne di classe (adapted from Scuola normale femminile by Matilde Serao; first performance: Napoli, Liceo Fonseca, 2011), and Umbra profunda. Frammenti della giovinezza di Giordano Bruno (Ginevra, 2013).

Selected publications
Vecce, Carlo. Piccola storia della letteratura italiana. Napoli: Liguori, 2009.
Vecce, Carlo. Iacopo Sannazaro in Francia: scoperte di codici all'inizio del XVI secolo. Padova: Antenore, 1988.
 Vecce, Carlo, editor. Donato Bramante, Sonetti e altri scritti  Roma : Salerno Editrice, 1995.
 
 
Vecce, Carlo. Il sorriso di Caterina. La madre di Leonardo. Giunti Editore, 2023, ISBN 9788809964235

References 

Living people
1959 births
Academic staff of the University of Pavia
Academic staff of the University of Macerata
Academic staff of the D'Annunzio University of Chieti–Pescara
Università Cattolica del Sacro Cuore alumni